Le Tremblay is a former commune in the Maine-et-Loire department in western France. On 15 December 2016, it was merged into the new commune Ombrée d'Anjou.

Geography
The river Verzée forms all of the commune's northern border.

See also
Communes of the Maine-et-Loire department

References

Tremblay